Jon Harris (born 1943) is an artist, illustrator, and calligrapher, who has a particular interest in architecture and topography. He lives in Cambridge, which he has made his base since he graduated from Cambridge University, with a degree in Art History, in 1965. Cambridge is also the principal subject of his drawings. Harris is particularly known for his illustrated, calligraphic, maps.

Early life
Harris was born in 1943, in North Staffordshire; he had an itinerant, partly colonial youth. He was educated at Winchester College, where he was a scholar. He began in Architecture at Trinity Hall, Cambridge University in 1961, and finished in Art History.

Career
Harris published an article in Granta in 1962 on Cambridge’s 19th-century architect/developer Richard Reynolds Rowe. He taught drawing for 25 years in the Cambridge Arts School (CCAT, now Anglia Ruskin University), and painted (topography and light) until this career came to end with a joint exhibition between the Fitzwilliam Museum and the Cambridge University School of Architecture. A catalog was published by the Fitzwilliam Museum.

He wrote for eight years on the landscapes and settlements of the four East Anglia counties and explored them on foot. In 2003 he was lured by his friend and former Reuters correspondent Brian Mooney into walking the shores and inland boundaries of the county of Essex. The report of the journey, with text by Brian Mooney and numerous illustrations by Jon Harris, was published as Frontier Country (Thorogood 2004).

Due to his profound knowledge of the architectural history of Cambridge, Jon Harris often serves as a historical advisor on developments and refurbishments in Cambridge. He is a member of Cambridge City Council's Design & Conservation Panel, before which significant new developments are brought for appraisal. In 2007 he advised Magdalene College on the colour scheme for the restoration of a range of medieval buildings in Magdalene Street, Cambridge.

A collection of his work has been published by Cambridge-based publishing house Lutterworth Press in September 2018; this is the first time a collection of his work has been published. The book, titled Artist About Cambridge is a biographical look at Harris' work and how the city of Cambridge has changed over the past few decades.

References 
 Painter About Cambridge, Fitzwilliam Museum, 1997
 Frontier Country (Brian Mooney, illustrated by Jon Harris), Thorogood, 2004
 Artist About Cambridge, Lutterworth Press, 2018.

British artists
Living people
1943 births
People educated at Winchester College
Alumni of Trinity Hall, Cambridge